Pól Thorsteinsson (born 17 November 1973 in Vágur, Suðuroy) is a retired Faroese football player. He has been spent most of his career in the Faroe Islands, while he had brief stints in Iceland and Denmark. At the end of his career Pól Thorsteinsson played with VB/Sumba, who won the Faroese 1. division; in 2010 they changed their name to FC Suðuroy, and the team will be playing in the best division Vodafonedeildin, but Pól Thorsteinsson decided to end his football career at the end of the 2009 season. He has been capped for the Faroe Islands at senior level.

Football career

International Football career
Pól Thorsteinsson has played 37 matches with the Faroe Islands national football team in the period 1997 to 2004. He played as a defender.

Club career

 VB Vágur and Sumba/VB 1991-1996
 OB Odense 1996 (he played for the second best team)
 VB Vágur1997
 B36 1998-99
 Valur, Iceland 2000
 B36 2001 
 NSÍ 2002
 B36 2003-2005 
 NSÍ 2006-2007
 VB/Sumba 2008-2009

Faroe Islands Cup - Løgmanssteypið
Pól Thorsteinsson has won the Løgmanssteypið, the Faroe Islands Cup, three times: 2001 with B36, 2002 with NSÍ and 2003 with B36.

Winner of The National Faroese Championship
Three times Thorsteinsson has won the National Championship: 2001 and 2005 with B36 and 2007 with NSÍ.

Top Scorer for VB Vágur
In 2009 Thorsteinsson scored his 50th goal for VB/Sumba (prior to 2005 it was just called VB, since 1 Jan 2010 the team is called FC Suðuroy). He was top scorer for this team in 1993 (6 goals), 1994 (12 goals) and 1997 (10 goals).

Board Member of FC Suðuroy 
Thorsteinsson has stopped playing football in the best division; he played with VB/Sumba in the first division in 2009 and they won the division. The team changed its name from 1 January 2010, now it is called FC Suðuroy and in 2010 it will play in the best division in Faroese football, which currently (2010) is called Vodafonedeildin. Thorsteinsson is chief financial officer for FC Suðuroy. Chairman for FC Suðuroy is Bjarni Johansen.

References

External links
 www.fcsuduroy.fo FC Suðuroy
 FaroeSoccer.com, Pól Thorsteinsson's profile.
 www.fcb36.org B36 Tórshavn
 www.nsi.fo FC NSÍ
 www.football.fo Faroe Islands Football Association
 www.vagur.fo Municipality of Vágur

1973 births
Living people
Faroese footballers
Faroe Islands international footballers
Expatriate footballers in Iceland
VB Vágur players
FC Suðuroy players
NSÍ Runavík players
Faroese expatriates in Iceland
B36 Tórshavn players
People from Vágur
Association football defenders